Marie Davids (1847–1905) was a German painter.

Life 
Davids was born in Rendsburg and became a pupil of Alexander Struys. She was active in Berlin and created mainly portraits. In 1896 and 1904 she exhibited at the International Exhibition. Only in 1889 she was mentioned in the Berliner Adressbuch (Berlin directory) in Bülowstraße 21. 1897 she moved to Nollenorfstraße 10. Her last studio was in Berlin-Tiergarten, Lützowstraße 82. Her work Portrait of Fräulein von Sydow was included in the book Women Painters of the World. Marie Davids stayed unmarried.

See also
 List of German women artists

References

1847 births
1905 deaths
People from Rendsburg
German women painters